Charles Hale (1831–1882) of Boston was an American legislator and diplomat. Intermittently from 1855 to 1877, he served in the Massachusetts state House and Senate. He was Speaker of the House in 1859. In the 1860s he lived in Cairo, Egypt, as the American consul-general.  From 1872 to 1873 he worked as United States Assistant Secretary of State under Hamilton Fish.

Biography

Hale was born in Boston on June 7, 1831, to Nathan Hale and Sarah Preston Everett. Siblings included Sarah Everett Hale, Nathan Hale Jr., Lucretia Peabody Hale, Edward Everett Hale, Alexander Hale, and Susan Hale.

Charles graduated from Harvard College in 1850; whilst a student he rowed in the Undine Club. He served as class secretary, 1850–1882.

In his early career, Hale worked as a journalist. He founded the short-lived journal To-Day: a Boston Literary Journal in 1852, of which only two volumes were published. He also contributed to his father's paper, the Boston Daily Advertiser, in the 1850s and 1860s.  There he started as a reporter after graduation, and was later a junior editor. He also contributed to the North American Review and to the Nautical Almanac.

In 1855, Hale was elected to the Massachusetts House of Representatives and was chosen Speaker in 1859, up to that time the youngest man ever chosen for the position. He served as U.S. consul-general in Cairo, Egypt, 1864–1870. In Cairo he "arrested the conspirator, John Surratt," suspected of plotting the assassination of Abraham Lincoln.

In 1866, he was elected as a member to the American Philosophical Society.

In 1871, he was elected to the Massachusetts Senate. He was appointed chairman of the committee on railroads, in which capacity he drew up a general railroad act, and was active in securing its enactment. From 1872 to 1873 he worked as Assistant United States Secretary of State, under Hamilton Fish. He returned to Boston and was again elected to the state House of Representatives in 1876 and 1877. He was also appointed State Commissioner of Public Lands, responsible for "laying out the Back Bay."

During the latter part of his life he lived in retirement, occupied in literary work, and much of the time was an invalid. He died in Boston on March 1, 1882. A funeral was held at the South Congregational Church on March 4, at 3pm. "Among those present were Mayor Green, the Hon. Robert R. Bishop, President of the State Senate; the Rev. Edward Everett Hale, and other relatives of the deceased man, and also the Senators and Representatives who served during Mr. Hale's term in the Legislature; the members of the Harvard Class of '50, and the employees of the Boston Daily Advertiser." He is buried in Mount Auburn Cemetery.

Works
 To-Day: a Boston Literary Journal. v.1 (January–June, 1852);  v.2 (July–December, 1852).
 
 
 Documents in: 
 "The Khedive and the Court." Atlantic Monthly, May 1876.
 "Municipal Indebtedness." Atlantic Monthly, December 1876.

See also
 1859 Massachusetts legislature
 1874 Massachusetts legislature
 1875 Massachusetts legislature
 1876 Massachusetts legislature

References

Further reading
 Hon. Charles Hale. New York Times, Feb 14, 1872. p. 1.
 Alpha Delta Phi: college secret society in convention. ... Oration by Charles Hale of Boston ... Contrasts Between Egyptian and American Civilization. Other American Visitors to Egypt. Contemporary History of Egypt. The Reign of Ismall Pacha. The Pacha's Dignity. Ismall Pacha's Claim to Statesmanship. Railroad Progress in Egypt. Telegraph Extension. Admirable Systems of Statistics. Boston Daily Globe, Jun 4, 1875. p. 1.
 Dictionary of American Biography. 1879
 The life and letters of Edward Everett Hale. Boston: Little, Brown, 1917
 Letters of Susan Hale. Boston: Marshall Jones company, 1919.
 
 Karen Sánchez-Eppler. "Practicing For Print: The Hale Children's Manuscript Libraries." Journal of the History of Childhood and Youth, Volume 1, Number 2, Spring 2008.

1831 births
1882 deaths
19th-century American journalists
19th-century American male writers
19th-century American people
American male journalists
Boston Daily Advertiser people
Burials at Mount Auburn Cemetery
Harvard College alumni
Massachusetts state senators
Members of the Massachusetts House of Representatives
Politicians from Boston
Speakers of the Massachusetts House of Representatives
19th-century American politicians
Ambassadors of the United States to Egypt